Abraham Jacob Terkeltaub (born 1986) is an American journalist and humorist who writes under the pen name Turx. He is currently the senior White House correspondent and chief political correspondent for the magazine Ami. He is also a political contributor at Newsmax.

The first Hasidic Jew to become a member of the White House press corps, Turx received international media coverage on February 16, 2017, after posing a question regarding anti-Semitism  to President Donald Trump during a press conference.

Early life and education 
Abraham Jacob Terkeltaub, born in Borough Park, Brooklyn, is the eldest of eleven children. As a child, he studied in Yeshiva Bnei Tzion of Bobov.

At a young age, Turx and his family moved to Los Angeles, California. There he attended the cheder of a Los Angeles elementary school and the Yeshivas Rav Isacsohn. For high school, Hamesivta of Los Angeles, and Telshe Yeshiva of Chicago.

Turx also studied informally at Columbia University Graduate School of Journalism in New York, under New York Times columnist Professor Ari Goldman. He speaks three languages: English, Yiddish, and Hebrew.

Professional career
Turx began his professional career as a camp counselor, and then as a head counselor, in Camp Machane Yehuda/Yeshivas Hakayitz. He also served as a rabbi/teacher in Yeshiva Rav Isacsohn.

Turx is CEO of "TurxWurx" Studio. He is also on the board of marketing of The Voice of Lakewood, and a regular contributor to Zman, two local magazines. He is also a contributor to Kol Mevaser, a Yiddish language news line. Turx was a teacher in the Lakewood Cheder School from 2008 to 2017, and is the program director at Camp Chevra.

Ami magazine political correspondent
Turx began writing for Ami magazine in February 2011. As the magazine's political correspondent, he conducted interviews with dozens of United States senators, governors, congressional representatives, and presidential candidates. Turx met with, and interviewed, every candidate for president in the 2012 primary season, as well as more than half of the candidates of the 2016 cycle.

He writes a regular humor/satire column in Ami, in addition to political commentary and analysis. Since the start of the Presidency of Donald Trump in 2017, he has been a member of White House press corps, and the Senior White House Correspondent and Washington Bureau Chief for Ami magazine.

Trump press conference incident

On February 16, 2017, during President Trump's first solo press briefing, Turx began to ask a question regarding the government's response to an uptick in anti-Semitic threats across the United States. Trump cut Turx off as he was attempting to complete his question, and responded negatively, calling Turx a liar and telling him to sit down. As Trump responded to the question, Turx attempted to interject, prompting Trump to tell him to be silent.
Several Jewish organizations, including the Anti-Defamation League and David Harris, the chief executive of the American Jewish Committee, criticized Trump's handling of the incident.

Following the incident, Turx appeared on several nationwide news programs, including Tucker Carlson Tonight and Anderson Cooper 360, where he stated that it was his impression that the president had misunderstood his question and that he continues to believe that the president is not an anti-Semite, nor are any of his senior staff.
Turx tweeted, "President Trump clearly misunderstood my question. This is highly regretful and I'm going to seek clarification".

Newsmax Contributor
In 2021, Terkeltaub was named a political contributor at Newsmax, becoming the first hasidic person to hold such a high-profile position at a prominent news outlet.

Relationship with Azerbaijan 
Jake Turx has written positively about the Republic of Azerbaijan and the rise of Heydar Aliyev, father of current President Ilham Aliyev. In 2023, in the middle of the blockade of the Republic of Artsakh, Jake Turx was one of the foreign journalists who traveled to Nagorno-Karabakh, and he reported not seeing any blockade, with cars being able to pass unhindered. His statements have subsequently drawn criticism, with allegations that his trip was paid for and arranged by the government of Azerbaijan.

Media appearances 
Turx has appeared on Al Jazeera, The Young Turks, Tucker Carlson Tonight, Anderson Cooper 360, CNN Newsroom with Brooke Baldwin, i24news, NPR's "1A" Show, and Sky News.

Published work 
A book written by Turx, titled Stop, Drop, & LOL, was published by Menucha Publishers.

Personal life
Turx resides in Washington, DC during the work week. His family lives in Toms River, NJ.

In 2018 for Take Our Daughters and Sons to Work Day Turx took two of his children to the White House to partake in a "press briefing" organized for the children of the White House correspondents.
Donning a MAGA cap, his son asked press secretary Sarah Huckabee Sanders the following question, dubbed "kinda epic" by his father who said it was "his own idea": "After President Trump makes America great again, what job will there be for future presidents?"

References

External links
C-SPAN Video of Turx asking question at Trump Press Conference

Living people
American political journalists
American male non-fiction writers
Journalists from Washington, D.C.
Writers from Los Angeles
People from Lakewood Township, New Jersey
Jewish American journalists
Journalists from New York (state)
1986 births
American Orthodox Jews
21st-century American Jews